The 2015 Woking Borough Council election took place on 7 May 2015 to elect one third of members to Woking Borough Council in England coinciding with other local elections held simultaneously with a General Election which resulted in increased turnout compared to the election four years before.  Elections in each ward are held in three years out of four.

Results
The Conservatives were starting from a high ‘baseline’, having performed very well in the previous equivalent local election in Woking in 2011 (which coincided with the AV Referendum). The Conservatives secured 49% of the vote, gaining two seats from the Liberal Democrats and losing one to Labour. Of the 12 wards up for election, the Conservatives won 10 and the LibDems and Labour won 1 each. This was the best Conservative local Borough election result in Woking, and the worst result for the LibDems, for many years, although the Conservative 49% share of the vote failed to match the 56% share of the vote achieved on the same day by their Parliamentary candidate Jonathan Lord as he secured re-election as Woking’s MP with a landslide majority of 20,810 votes (over the second-placed Labour Party candidate).

The result added one councillor (net) to the Conservative group that had enjoyed overall control of the Council since 2011 and that had been in power locally since 2007 (if one includes a short period of minority administration).

Ward by ward

References

2015 English local elections
May 2015 events in the United Kingdom
2015
2010s in Surrey